Joseph D. Hamm is an American politician serving as a member of the Pennsylvania House of Representatives from the 84th district. Elected in November 2020, he assumed office on December 1, 2020.

Education 
Hamm graduated from Williamsport Area High School in 2003 and earned a Bachelor of Arts degree in political science from Lock Haven University of Pennsylvania in 2009. Hamm's career experience includes working as a borough manager.

Career 
After graduating from high school, Hamm enlisted in the Pennsylvania Army National Guard. He served until 2008, including a one-year tour in Iraq. After earning his college degree, Hamm served as borough manager of Jersey Shore, Pennsylvania and a member of the Hepburn Township Board of Supervisors.

And hamm was assigned to the following committees:

 House Local Government Committee
 House Veterans Affairs & Emergency Preparedness Committee
 House Environmental Resources & Energy Committee
 House Game & Fisheries Committee

References 

Living people
Republican Party members of the Pennsylvania House of Representatives
Lock Haven University of Pennsylvania alumni
Year of birth missing (living people)